The Holy Family with a Little Bird is a c.1650 oil on canvas painting by Bartolomé Esteban Murillo, acquired for the Spanish royal collection by Elisabeth Farnese in 1744 and now in the Prado Museum in Madrid. It shows Saint Joseph the Virgin Mary and the Christ Child.

References

Paintings of the Holy Family
Paintings by Bartolomé Esteban Murillo in the Museo del Prado

1650 paintings
Birds in art
Dogs in art